Francis William Mahovlich   (born January 10, 1938) is a Canadian former professional ice hockey player and a former Liberal Senator in the Canadian Senate. He played on six Stanley Cup-winning teams and is an inductee of the Hockey Hall of Fame. In 2017 Mahovlich was named one of the '100 Greatest NHL Players' in history. Mahovlich was inducted into the Ontario Sports Hall of Fame in 1999. His brother Peter also played in the NHL. His nickname is "The Big M".

Playing career
The son of immigrants from Croatia, Mahovlich was scouted by several National Hockey League teams while playing for the Schumacher Lions of the Northern Ontario Hockey Association. He signed with the Toronto Maple Leafs, who sent him to one of their Ontario Hockey Association affiliates, the Toronto St. Michael's Majors. Mahovlich played there while attending St. Michael's College School from 1954 to 1957. While at St. Michael's, he received instruction from Joe Primeau, who Mahovlich would later call the best coach he ever had. Mahovlich received the Red Tilson Trophy as the top player in the OHA for the 1956–57 season, in which he scored 52 goals in 49 games.

He joined the Leafs in 1957 and was a 20-goal scorer in his first season, winning the Calder Memorial Trophy as rookie of the year in what was otherwise a rough season with the last-place Leafs. During the off-season, he took courses at Assumption University in Windsor, Ontario. At the same time, Punch Imlach was hired to run the Leafs and soon became head coach and general manager.

In the 1960–61 season, Imlach put Mahovlich on a line with Red Kelly and Bob Nevin. The three immediately clicked and were the team's top three scorers that year, led by Mahovlich's 48 goals—a Leaf record that would stand for 21 years. The following season, the Leafs won the Stanley Cup, and repeated as champions in 1963 and 1964. Mahovlich led the team in goals scored in all three seasons.

Initially, Mahovlich and Imlach got along well, but their relationship deteriorated after winning the 1962 Stanley Cup, particularly when Mahovlich's contract was up for renewal at the end of the 1962 season. He felt the Leafs gave him a low-ball offer and walked out on the team during training camp in September. Red Burnett at the Toronto Star described the situation as a "cold war" between Imlach and Mahovlich.

A further incident worsened the situation. At that time, the National Hockey League All-Star Game was played at the beginning of the season, and during a reception in Toronto attended by team executives in the days before the 1962 game, Chicago Black Hawks owner James D. Norris offered the Leafs $1 million for Mahovlich. He believed he had an agreement with Leafs co-owner Harold Ballard and paid $1,000 as a deposit with the balance to be delivered by cheque the next morning. The next day, the Leafs gave Mahovlich the money he had been asking for, and told the Black Hawks that their apparent agreement the night before had been a misunderstanding. The Leafs returned the $1,000 deposit. The Black Hawks accused the Leafs of reneging on a deal. Conn Smythe, at this point a minority shareholder in the Leafs, was adamant that the deal should be rejected. Mahovlich eventually spoke out publicly and reaffirmed his commitment to the Leafs.

Mahovlich also had a rocky relationship with fans at Maple Leaf Gardens and was often booed at home games. Imlach—who mispronounced Mahovlich's name for years—became a constant critic and, under pressure from fans and management, Mahovlich was admitted to Toronto General Hospital in November 1964, suffering from what was publicly described as "constant fatigue" but diagnosed as acute depression. Mahovlich was flooded with well-wishes from fans during his time off. He returned to the lineup a month later and was still able to lead the Leafs in scoring in the 1964–65 season, despite missing 11 games. Mahovlich led the Leafs in scoring again in the 1965–66 season.

The Leafs won the Stanley Cup in the 1966–67 season, with Mahovlich having his lowest-scoring year in seven seasons. Early into the next season, Mahovlich was again admitted to hospital, although this time it was acknowledged publicly as depression and tension. "Mahovlich is a sensitive, easily-bruised individual," wrote Milt Dunnell in a page-one story in the Toronto Star. 

Mahovlich was part of an six-player blockbuster transaction in which he was traded along with Pete Stemkowski and Garry Unger from the Maple Leafs to the Detroit Red Wings for Norm Ullman, Paul Henderson and Floyd Smith on March 4, 1968. The Maple Leafs and Red Wings were in fifth and sixth place respectively at the bottom of the East Division standings. He had 19 goals and 17 assists in 50 games that season and was the leading goalscorer in Maple Leafs franchise history with 296 at the time of the deal. He joined a Red Wings team that also featured his younger brother Pete. He said in a press conference announcing the trade, "Business is business and if I can't please them here, maybe I'll be able to please them there." 

Mahovlich had a strong finish to the season with the Red Wings, and the following year put up his best point totals in eight seasons, playing on a line with Gordie Howe and Alex Delvecchio, and setting his personal record for goals in a season with 49. Initially, one of his teammates on the Red Wings was his younger brother, Peter Mahovlich, who split his time between the Wings and their minor league affiliate.

In 1970–71, Red Wings general manager Sid Abel wanted to get rid of coach Ned Harkness and was overruled by team owner Bruce Norris. Once Harkness took over as general manager, he got rid of players he deemed a threat to him. On January 13, 1971, Mahovlich was traded to the Montreal Canadiens for Mickey Redmond, Guy Charron and Bill Collins. He was reunited with his brother, who had become a star player himself with the Canadiens. Mahovlich spent three-and-a-half seasons in Montreal, playing on the Stanley Cup-winning teams of 1971 and 1973. During the 1971–72 season, Mahovlich scored a career-high 96 points, which he nearly matched the following season with 93 points.

He also was a member of Team Canada for the 1972 Summit Series against the Soviet Union. In 1974, he left the NHL for the World Hockey Association, and represented Canada again at the 1974 Summit Series. In the WHA, he played for the Toronto Toros and the Birmingham Bulls until his retirement in 1979 at the age of 41. While with the Bulls, Mahovlich was placed on an unproductive line with enforcers Frank Beaton and Dave Hanson, one of the Hanson Brothers who had been in the movie Slap Shot. According to John Brophy, when a reporter asked Mahovlich what was wrong, he replied, "I don’t know, but I seem to play a lot better with Howe and Delvecchio."

He attempted an NHL comeback with the Detroit Red Wings in 1979, but it was unsuccessful, and he formally retired on October 7, 1979.

In an NHL documentary about the Stanley Cup, Mahovlich claimed credit for being the first player to hoist the Stanley Cup above his head. After the Leafs' victory in the 1963 Cup Finals, in the team locker room, Mahovlich said he held the Cup, felt how light it was, and hoisted it above his head, which was then photographed.

Awards and achievements
Calder Memorial Trophy winner in 1958.
Played in 1959, 1960, 1961, 1962, 1963, 1964, 1965, 1967, 1968, 1969, 1970, 1971, 1972, 1973, and 1974 NHL All-Star Games.
Selected to the NHL First All-Star Team in 1961, 1963, and 1973.
Selected to the NHL Second All-Star Team in 1962, 1964, 1965, 1966, 1969, and 1970.
Stanley Cup champion in 1962, 1963, 1964, 1967, 1971 and 1973.
Inducted into the Hockey Hall of Fame in 1981.
Inducted into Canada's Sports Hall of Fame in 1990.
In 1997, he was ranked number 26 on The Hockey News''' list of the 100 Greatest Hockey Players.
Inaugural inductee into the World Hockey Association Hall of Fame as a "Legends of the Game" in 2010
Number (27) Retired by the Toronto Maple Leafs (shared with Darryl Sittler)
 In January, 2017, Mahovlich was part of the first group of players to be named one of the '100 Greatest NHL Players' in history.

Career statistics

Regular season and playoffs

* Stanley Cup Champion.

International

Post-playing career
Mahovlich was inducted into the Hockey Hall of Fame in 1981 and Canada's Sports Hall of Fame in 1990. In 1994, he was made a Member of the Order of Canada.

In 1997, Mahovlich was ranked number 26 on The Hockey News's'' list of the 100 Greatest Hockey Players, the highest-ranking player who had spent at least a majority of his career with the Maple Leafs.

In 1998, Mahovlich was appointed to the Senate of Canada by Prime Minister Jean Chrétien. He retired from the senate on January 10, 2013.

See also
 Lists of Canadian senators
 List of Ontario senators
 List of NHL statistical leaders
 List of NHL players with 1000 points
 Notable families in the NHL
 List of NHL players with 500 goals

References

External links

1938 births
Birmingham Bulls players
Calder Trophy winners
Canadian ice hockey forwards
Canadian monarchists
Canadian people of Croatian descent
Canadian senators from Ontario
Canadian sportsperson-politicians
Detroit Red Wings players
Hockey Hall of Fame inductees
Sportspeople from Timmins
Liberal Party of Canada senators
Living people
Members of the Order of Canada
Montreal Canadiens players
National Hockey League All-Stars
Stanley Cup champions
Toronto Maple Leafs players
Toronto St. Michael's Majors players
Toronto Toros players
University of Windsor alumni
Ice hockey people from Ontario
21st-century Canadian politicians